The Appleby Building (also known as the Resurrection House) is a historic site in Sarasota, Florida, United States. It is located at 501-513 Kumquat Court. On June 28, 2001, it was added to the U.S. National Register of Historic Places.

References

External links
 Sarasota County listings at National Register of Historic Places
 Appleby Building at Florida's Office of Cultural and Historical Programs

National Register of Historic Places in Sarasota County, Florida
Buildings and structures in Sarasota, Florida